Shock Value is the second solo studio album by record producer Timbaland. It is Timbaland's first release on his own imprint, the Interscope Records-distributed Mosley Music Group. Shock Value features a long list of guest artists, among them Fall Out Boy, Justin Timberlake, The Hives, Keri Hilson, Nelly Furtado, Missy Elliott, 50 Cent, Tony Yayo, Dr. Dre, OneRepublic, Elton John, Magoo and Nicole Scherzinger.

Background and release
"Release" is featured in the EA Sports game Madden NFL 08 and "The Way I Are" is also on the soundtrack of NBA Live 08. On April 16, the unreleased song "Laugh at 'Em" was leaked to the Internet. It was originally supposed to be on the album but was not completed in time. It features Jay-Z and Justin Timberlake. The song is now surnamed as the "Give It to Me" remix. Another unreleased track called "I See U", featuring Attitude and D.O.E., was also leaked to the internet.

An instrumental version of the album was released on the iTunes Store on July 31, 2007.

The album was supposed to be supported by a Shock Value 2008 Tour. The tour was to begin in Australia and continue to New Zealand, but was postponed and then canceled because the expected amount that Showtime Touring was to pay Timbaland was unavailable, and the star refused to perform. There had also been many scheduling conflicts with Europe. The tour was canceled one day before it was to begin.

Critical reception

Shock Value received generally mixed reviews from music critics. At Metacritic, which assigns a weighted mean rating out of 100 to reviews from mainstream critics, the album received a weighted mean score of 54, based on 24 reviews, indicating "mixed or average reviews".

Chart performance
The album debuted at No. 5 on the US Billboard 200, with 138,000 copies sold. It debuted at No. 10 in the UK and on the week of July 22 climbed to No. 5. The album has since reached No. 2 in the UK and No. 13 in France.

The album was certified Platinum in Canada (100,000 units) by the CRIA in August 2007. On the Australian ARIA Albums Chart, Shock Value was certified 3× Platinum with sales of 210,000+ copies. It reached the top of the album chart on the week beginning December 31, 2007.

In BBC Radio 1's end of year chart for 2007, Shock Value was the ninth bestselling album in the UK.

On July 3, 2008, Shock Value had sold 2,234,971 in the United States, and 3,500,000 copies worldwide.

Singles
"Give It to Me" was released as the first single on March 15, 2007. It peaked at No. 1 on the Billboard Hot 100, scoring Timbaland his first US No.1. Meanwhile, it also scored Timbaland his first UK No.1. It features additional vocals from Nelly Furtado and Justin Timberlake.
"The Way I Are" was released as the second single on June 15, 2007. It peaked at No. 3 on the Billboard Hot 100 and at No. 1 on the UK Singles Chart to score Timbaland his second UK No.1. It features additional vocals from Keri Hilson and a rap verse from D.O.E.
"Apologize" was released as the third single on August 12, 2007. It is a remix of OneRepublic's "Apologize" and features the same vocals from the original. It peaked at No. 2 on the Billboard Hot 100, while it peaked No. 3 on the UK Singles Chart. On the Billboard Hot 100 Songs of the Decade, "Apologize" came 10th, making it his most successful song ever.
"Scream" was released as the fourth single and final single on December 7, 2007. It failed to chart on the Billboard Hot 100 but did peak at No. 12 on the UK Singles Chart. It features additional vocals from Keri Hilson and Nicole Scherzinger.

Other songs
"Throw It on Me" was originally set to be released as the third single, yet it was instead released as a US Promotional Single on August 5, 2007. It features main vocals from The Hives. It peaked at No. 96 on the Billboard Hot 100. A music video for the song was released in late 2007.
"Bounce" was released as a promotional single in the US on February 8, 2008, after it was featured in the soundtrack for Step Up 2: The Streets. It features a chorus from Justin Timberlake and features rap verses from Dr. Dre and Missy Elliott. It peaked at No. 93 on the Billboard Hot 100. The song uses an uncredited sample of the song "Dirty Talk" by Klein + M.B.O.

One Life to Live appearances
Two songs from the album were performed on an episode of the ABC soap opera One Life to Live on October 9, 2007. Timbaland performed "The Way I Are" with Keri Hilson, D.O.E., and Sebastian. OneRepublic appeared in the same episode and performed "Apologize".

Track listing

Notes
  signifies a co-producer
  signifies a vocal producer
 "Oh Timbaland" contains samples "Sinner Man" by Nina Simone.
 "Boardmeeting" contains interpolations from "Get Down on It" by Kool & the Gang and replayed elements from "The Breaks" by Kurtis Blow.

Personnel 

K. Alexander Jr. – chorus (17)
Marcella "Ms. Lago" Araica – programming (10), backing vocals (8), engineer (3, 5, 8, 10), mixing (4, 5, 6, 10, 11, 12)
James Barton – mixing assistant (10)
Jim Beanz – vocals (12), backing vocals (3, 6), vocal producer (3, 12)
Stevie Blacke – strings (17)
Adam Bravin – bass (14)
Míguel Bustamante – assistant engineer (6, 11, 12)
Kelvin Chu – A&R
Ciara Cleary - Assistant
D. Davis – chorus (17)
Justin Dreyfuss – marketing coordinator
Andrew Flad – marketing
Rick Frazier – project coordinator
Keisha Gamble – project coordinator (9)
Mark Gray – engineer (8), assistant engineer (1, 6, 7, 13)
Matty Green – assistant engineer (2, 3, 17)
Johan Gustafsson – engineer (13)
Barry Hankerson – executive producer
Jerome Harmon – bass (8), strings (8, 16), keyboards (5, 16, 18)
A. Helaire – chorus (17)
Keri Hilson – backing vocals (3)
Bob Horn – mixing (9)
Andrew Hurley – drums (15)
Monique Idlett-Mosley – publicity, marketing
S. Jackson – chorus (17)
Jermaine "Tank" Jennings – steel guitar (1)
Elton John – piano (17)
Tiffany Johnson – project manager
Gary Jordan – project coordinator (9)
Hannon Lane – drums, keyboards, producer (15)
N. Lollis – chorus (17)
Ari Mihelson – photography
E. Millsap – chorus (17)
Walter Milsap – choir conductor (17)
Julian Peploe – package design
Kevin Rudolf – guitar (3, 10)
Manny Smith – A&R
Marcus Spence – A&R
Johnkenun Spivery – organ (1)
Patrick Stump – guitar (15)
Ron Taylor – digital editing (1, 3, 4, 7, 8, 10, 14, 18)
Ryan Tedder – producer (16)
Timbaland – synthesizer (1, 8), drums (1, 2, 3, 4, 8, 10, 14, 17), guitar (13, 14), keyboards (3), producer (1, 2, 3, 4, 5, 6, 7, 8, 10, 12, 13, 14, 15, 16, 17, 18), executive producer, musician (5, 6, 12, 13, 18)
Andrew Van Meter – production coordination
Justin Warfield – guitar (14)
Dan Warner – bass (3, 14), guitar (3, 10, 13, 14)
Albert Watson – photography
E. Watson – chorus (17)
D. Williams – chorus (17)
Craig Longmiles – writer (3)

Charts

Weekly charts

Year-end charts

Certifications

Shock Value 2008 Tour

The Shock Value 2008 Tour was supposed to be Timbaland's concert tour to support his album, Timbaland Presents: Shock Value. Dates in Australia and New Zealand were announced. However, the tour was canceled one day before it was going to begin due to scheduling conflicts in Europe.

Tour dates (all canceled)

References

2007 albums
Albums produced by Danja (record producer)
Albums produced by Ryan Tedder
Albums produced by Timbaland
Interscope Records albums
Timbaland albums